Brennevinsfjorden is a fjord in Gustav V Land at Nordaustlandet, Svalbard. The fjord has a length of about eleven nautical miles, and runs in between Depotodden and Kapp Hansteen.

References

Fjords of Svalbard
Nordaustlandet